The 2018 South Sudan National Cup is the 6th edition of the South Sudan National Cup, the knockout football competition of South Sudan.

Group stage
There were two groups, with Group A played in Juba and Group B played in Aweil.

Al-Merreikh won Group A and Al-Ghazala won Group B.

Final
The final was played on 14 August 2018 at the Juba Stadium in Juba.

Al-Merreikh Juba 2–0 Al-Ghazala

See also
2018 South Sudan Football Championship

References

External links
South Sudan Football Association Facebook page

South Sudan
Cup
Football competitions in South Sudan
2018 in African football